Mirza Gul Muhammad (d. 1800) was an Indian military official in the Mughal Empire and the independent chief of Qadian. He was the grandfather of Mirza Ghulam Murtaza who was the father of Mirza Ghulam Ahmad.

Life and Reign
Gul Muhammad succeeded as the Qazi of Qadian upon the death of his father Faiz Muhammad and was the independent chief of Qadian and its surrounding country, ruling over 85 villages. He commanded an army of 1,000 consisting of infantry and cavalry. During his reign, the Mughal Empire had declined in Punjab.  Throughout his life, he fought against the insurgent Sikhs and solicited the support of four successive Mughal Emperors. Although they supported him verbally they offered no practical assistance which resulted in the formation of the Sikh Empire and ended Mughal control within the Punjab region. Ghiyas-ul-Daula, who was a minister of the Mughal Empire had come to Qadian and was impressed to see that the state was being run according to Islamic principles.

References

1800 deaths
Indian people of Turkic descent
Indian Muslims
Indian generals
Military personnel from Punjab, India